Yimei District is one of four districts of the prefecture-level city of Yichun, Heilongjiang, China. It was established by merging the former Yichun District, Meixi District and parts of Wumahe District approved by Chinese State Council in 2019. Its administrative centre is at Xuri Subdistrict.

Administrative divisions 
Yimei District is divided into 17 subdistricts. 
17 subdistricts
 Xuri Shequ, Lindou Shequ, Beijun Shequ, Dongsheng, Hongsheng Shequ, Yonghong Shequ, Nanjun Shequ, Xinxin Shequ, Fulin Shequ, Qianjin Shequ, Hongguang Shequ, Zhaoyang Shequ, Hongguang Shequyi, Xinxing Shequ, Shengli Shequ, Wenhua Shequ, Donglin Shequ

References

Yichun